Petru Godiac (born 1 October 1967, Talmaza) is an activist from Moldova. He was decorated, by a presidential decree, with Moldova's highest state decoration – the Order of the Republic.

Biography

Petru Godiac was born on 1 October 1967 in Talmaza, Ştefan Vodă District. He was a member of the Popular Front of Moldova in Tiraspol. Between April–June 1992, he fought in the War of Transnistria, but in June 1992 was captured. Petru Godiac and the other members of the "Tiraspol Six" were convicted on 9 December 1993 of "terrorist acts". Ilie Ilașcu, Alexandru Leșco, Tudor Petrov-Popa, Andrei Ivanțoc, Petru Godiac, and Valeriu Garbuz are known as the "Tiraspol Six". Petru Godiac was released on 12 June 1994. He has been living in Cluj-Napoca since 1995.

Awards
 The Order of the Republic - Moldova's highest state decoration
 Honorary citizen Cluj-Napoca

References

External links 
 Members of "Ilascu Group", awarded „Ordinul Republicii" 
  Jurnal de Chişinău, Membrii grupului Ilaşcu, decoraţi cu Ordinul Republicii 
  Hotărârea Curţii Europene a Drepturilor Omului în cazul Ilaşcu şi alţii c. Republica Moldova şi Rusia

1967 births
Living people
People from Ștefan Vodă District
Moldovan activists
Romanian people of Moldovan descent
Ilașcu Group
Romanian people convicted of murder
Moldovan people convicted of murder
Recipients of the Order of the Republic (Moldova)
Popular Front of Moldova politicians
Politics of Transnistria
History of Transnistria since 1991